United States Coast Guard Base Boston is  located in the North End, Boston, Massachusetts. The small boat station located on the base was re-opened in 2003 after being closed in 1996. It is also home to Flotilla 5-3 of the United States Coast Guard Auxiliary.

On 1 March 2021, the United States Department of Homeland Security solicited bids for base modifications to accommodate six new fast response cutters there. The Coast Guard is expected to take delivery of the first two of these cutters, USCGC William Chadwick (WPC-1150) and USCGC Warren Deyampert (WPC-1151), in the second half of 2022.

See also
List of military installations in Massachusetts

References

External links

USCG Base Boston homepage
New Coast Guard Station Commissioned in Boston Harbor

United States Coast Guard stations
North End, Boston
Boston Harbor
Military installations in Massachusetts